Tug is a 2010 American romantic comedy film written and directed by Abram Makowka and starring Sam Huntington, Haylie Duff, Zachary Knighton, and Sarah Drew. It was shown at the Newport Beach Film Festival & the Waterfront Film Festival.

Premise
A small-town guy (Huntington) tries to decide between staying with his current girlfriend (Drew) or going back to his psycho ex (Duff).

Cast
 Sam Huntington
 Haylie Duff as Kim
 Zachary Knighton as Judd
 Sarah Drew as Ariel
 Wendi McLendon-Covey as Taylor
 Maulik Pancholy as Carl
 Yeardley Smith as Mom
 Dennis North as Dad
 Skyler Stone as Agent
 David Zellner as Geno

Release
Tug was released on Amazon streaming on February 19, 2013.

References

External links
 
 
 Official Facebook page
 

2010 films
2010 romantic comedy films
American romantic comedy films
Films shot in Michigan
American independent films
2010 independent films
2010s English-language films
2010s American films